Eltz Manor is a Baroque palace in Vukovar, Croatia. The 18th-century manor is the location of the Vukovar City Museum. The manor, as it previously appeared, was depicted on the reverse of the Croatian 20 kuna banknote, issued in 1993 and 2001. The palace suffered substantial damages and destruction in 1991 during the Croatian War of Independence. However, after four years of restorations, it was completely restored to its pre-war appearance in October 2011.

History
In 1736, Philipp Karl von Eltz-Kempenich (1665–1743), the Archchancellor of the Holy Roman Empire and Prince-Archbishop of Mainz, purchased a Vukovar manor in Syrmia, in the eastern Kingdom of Slavonia, then part of the Habsburg monarchy ruled by Emperor Charles VI. The palace was originally built between 1749 and 1751 by the Archchancellor's descendants of the German Catholic noble House of Eltz and was gradually extended over time. The estates near the Military Frontier were, however, exposed to raids by Ottoman troops and local Hajduk paramilitary forces.

After the Yugoslav Partisans gained control over the country in late World War II, the manor was confiscated by the communist administration of Yugoslavia in 1944, and the family of Jakob Graf zu Eltz was forced to leave Vukovar. In 1990, he returned from Eltville to the newly established state of Croatia and became a member of the Sabor parliament at Zagreb. Eltz Manor, however, suffered a great deal of damage during the Croatian War of Independence, when it was bombarded by the Yugoslav People's Army during the Battle of Vukovar.

Gallery

See also
 List of Baroque residences
 Palace of Syrmia County

References

External links
Vukovar City Museum 

Castles in Croatia
Museums in Croatia
Houses completed in 1751
Rebuilt buildings and structures in Croatia
Buildings and structures in Vukovar-Syrmia County
1751 establishments in the Habsburg monarchy
Buildings and structures in Vukovar
Baroque palaces in Croatia
Eltz